KITSUNE (Kyutech standardized bus Imaging Technology System Utilizing Networking and Electron content measurements) is a nanosatellite developed by the HAK consortium, which consists of Haradaseiki Kogyo, Addnics Corporation, and Kyushu Institute of Technology (Kyutech). The spacecraft is a 6U CubeSat, and carries a high-resolution camera for Earth observation. KITSUNE was carried to the International Space Station (ISS) on board Cygnus NG-17, and was deployed from the ISS's Kibō Module on 24 March 2022 12:10 UTC. The deployment service of KITSUNE was provided by Mitsui Bussan Aerospace.

Mission
While in orbit, KITSUNE will conduct several missions, including observing Earth with a resolution of 5 m, and communicating in C band. It will also conduct store and forward, collecting data from ground-based sensor terminals.
Its optics is based on an smc PENTAX-DA* 300mm F4ED[IF]SDM lens.

SPATIUM-II
In the SPATIUM-II (SPATIUM : Space Precision Atomic-clock TIming Utility Mission) mission, a UHF signal will be sent from ground stations, and KITSUNE's on board software-defined radio and Raspberry Pi computer will calculate the signal delay time. From the signal delay time, the integral value of the charge density between the satellite and ground station (total electron content) can be calculated. The SPATIUM-II mission aims to demonstrate detecting signal delay time by an accuracy of 100 nanoseconds.

See also
 Aoba VELOX-IV
 Birds-1
 Birds-2

References

Satellites of Japan
2022 in Japan
Spacecraft launched in 2022